The small vesper mouse (Calomys laucha) is a rodent species from South America. It is found in Argentina, Bolivia, Brazil, Paraguay and Uruguay. It is one of the hosts of hantavirus, causing hantavirus pulmonary syndrome

References

Calomys
Rodents of South America
Mammals of Argentina
Mammals of Bolivia
Mammals of Brazil
Mammals of Paraguay
Mammals of Uruguay
Mammals described in 1814